is a Japanese and British singer-songwriter, actress and model. Born in Niigata, Japan, she emigrated to London with her parents at age five. She is known for her musical versatility and has been labelled a "musical chameleon". In 2017, she self-released her debut extended play, Rina. After signing to Dirty Hit in 2020, she released her debut studio album, Sawayama, to widespread critical acclaim. Her second studio album, Hold the Girl, was released on 16 September 2022. Outside her music career, Sawayama has modelled for several fashion campaigns and is set to make her film acting debut in John Wick: Chapter 4.

Early life
Sawayama was born on 16 August 1990 in Niigata, Japan. She lived there until the age of five, when her family decided to move to London, where she was raised and currently resides. She holds an indefinite leave to remain (ILR) visa in the UK. According to Sawayama, the family's original plan was to return to Japan when she turned ten, but they ultimately chose to stay in London. Due to her inability to communicate in English, Sawayama struggled to understand her teachers and peers. She eventually connected with others through pop music. At the age of sixteen, she began posting music covers on Myspace, and during sixth form she formed a hip hop group called Lazy Lion.

Sawayama attended Magdalene College, Cambridge where she studied politics, psychology and sociology. She graduated from the university with a degree in political science.

Career

2013–2016: Early career
Sawayama began her solo career in February 2013, with the single "Sleeping in Waking", produced by Justin "Hoost" Tailor. A 7-inch vinyl of the single, featuring a new song titled "Who?" as the B-side, was released in April 2013 through UK label Make Mine. Later that year, she released the single "Terror" on Halloween under the stage name of "Riina". Sawayama would later reveal in a 2021 Billboard interview that the reason she used only her first name is because her last name was "an inconvenience".

In June 2015, she released a music video, directed by Arvida Byström, to her track "Tunnel Vision". In 2016, she released the single "Where U Are", with an accompanying music video co-directed by Alessandra Kurr. The single explored human interaction with digital media, with Sawayama explaining: "Online, you can present your best edited self [and] your overheating phone substitutes human warmth. Weirdest of all – you're together, but also very alone." The song has been described as "nostalgic greatness… ultra-sweet and shimmering pop", and "90s R&B pop perfection".

2017–2020: Debut EP and Sawayama
In March 2017, her single "Cyber Stockholm Syndrome" premiered on The Fader. Sawayama described the genesis of the themes of the track as: "the digital world can offer vital support networks, voices of solidarity, refuge, escape. That's what 'Cyber Stockholm Syndrome' is about: pessimism, optimism, anxiety, and freedom."

In 2017, the singles "Alterlife" and "Tunnel Vision", a duet with Shamir, were released, followed by her debut EP Rina. Sawayama was then an unsigned artist, and Rina was released independently; she confirmed on Twitter that she worked for two to three years to save money to release the EP. The Guardian deemed the EP "bracing and modern", stating that Sawayama had proven "she can shepherd pop into the future, too". Pitchfork ranked Rina in its list of best pop and R&B albums of the year. In 2018, Sawayama released the single "Valentine" on Valentine's Day. The music video for the track "Ordinary Superstar" was released in June 2018. In August 2018, Sawayama released the track "Cherry", in which she explores her sexual identity. Sawayama embarked on her Ordinary Superstar Tour across the UK, the US and Canada in late 2018. In 2019, she performed as the supporting act for Charli XCX's tour across the UK.

In 2020, after signing to Dirty Hit records, Sawayama released the singles "STFU!", a nu-metal, heavy metal, pop and avant-pop song, and "Comme des Garçons (Like the Boys)", a "homage to early 2000s dance tracks", both from her then-upcoming debut album. A third single, the rock and 2000s R&B-inspired "XS", was released on 2 March. The following month, Sawayama released another single from the album titled "Chosen Family". Her debut album, Sawayama, was released on 17 April to widespread critical acclaim. In June 2020, she released a cover of "Dance in the Dark" by Lady Gaga as part of Spotify's Singles series. The song was recorded in Sawayama's home studio, her version replacing the Europop sound of the original song with nu-metal-influenced electropop. The album and aforementioned song was primarily produced by Clarence Clarity.

In late July 2020, Sawayama made a public tweet about her ineligibility to be nominated for major British music awards, such as the Mercury Prize and BRIT Awards, due to the fact that she does not hold British citizenship. The hashtag "#SawayamaIsBritish" became trending on Twitter in the UK shortly after. Sawayama's movement gained major support from Elton John online, who wrote that he was "happy to hear that the [BPI] are reviewing the rules that led to Rina Sawayama's well-deserved album being snubbed from this year's [Mercury Prize] list of nominees." The British Phonographic Industry (BPI) later changed the rules to allow anyone who had remained in the UK, including her, to be eligible. On 26 October 2020, Sawayama made her television debut performing the song "XS" on The Tonight Show Starring Jimmy Fallon. The following month, she released a song titled "Lucid", produced by BloodPop. On 4 December 2020, a deluxe version of Sawayama was released.

2021–present: Hold the Girl 
In April 2021, Sawayama released an updated version of her song "Chosen Family", as a duet with Elton John. The following month, Sawayama was cast in the fourth installment in the John Wick film series. In August 2021, Sawayama was included on Newsweek Japan "100 Japanese people respected by the world" list. Sawayama contributed a cover of the Metallica song "Enter Sandman" to the charity tribute album The Metallica Blacklist, released in September 2021. On 3 September 2021, a remix version of Lady Gaga's "Free Woman" by Clarence Clarity and Sawayama appeared on Gaga's remix album Dawn of Chromatica.

Sawayama also started working on her second studio album in 2021. In November 2021, she embarked to the first leg of her Dynasty Tour, in support of her debut album where she performed songs from Sawayama and her 2017 EP Rina. During her show in Glasgow on 13 November, and her show in London at the Roundhouse on 17 November, she performed a new song titled "Catch Me in the Air", from her upcoming album.

Sawayama featured on the single "Beg for You" by Charli XCX, released on 27 January 2022 and later on "Follow Me" by Brazilian drag queen Pabllo Vittar, released on 31 March of the same year. On 16 May, Sawayama announced that her second studio album Hold the Girl would be released on 16 September 2022. Its lead single "This Hell" was released on 18 May. "Catch Me in the Air" was released as the second single from the album on 27 June. The title track "Hold the Girl" was released as the album's third single on 27 July. On 25 August, "Phantom" was released as another single from the album. On 12 September, the final single from Hold the Girl, titled "Hurricanes", was released.

Other ventures

Modelling career
Sawayama has been signed to Anti-Agency and Elite Model Management. In 2017, she was chosen for Versus x Versace's fall winter campaign. She has also starred in campaigns for Jourdan Dunn's Missguided, and wrote and performed an original track titled "Play on Me" for Nicola Formichetti's MAC x Nicopanda. In September 2021, she walked the runway for Balmain to celebrate the ten-year anniversary of Olivier Rousteing being the head of the French House.

Collaborations
In 2016, Sawayama collaborated with Taiwanese visual artist, John Yuyi, on a visual series critiquing Asian, including Japanese, beauty standards. Subsequently, she was profiled in Vogue. In the interview, Sawayama described the genesis of the idea and collaboration: "For a lot of women in Japan, these are the expectations people put on them, from anime culture, kawaii culture… that can really put women at a disadvantage, objectifying and infantilising them." Sawayama has worked with Nicola Formichetti for MAC x Nicopanda. Formichetti also directed the music video for Sawayama's track "Ordinary Superstar". The genesis of the partnership was outlined in i-D.

Artistry and public image
In 2017, Sawayama was ranked in The Guardians "18 for '18" list as well as Dazeds "100 people shaping culture in 2017" list. Lady Gaga described Sawayama as "an experimental pop visionary who refuses to play by the rules". She has mentioned Madonna as a "huge inspiration" to her. Her main influences came from 1990s and 2000s musical acts such as Christina Aguilera, Lady Gaga, Katy Perry, Avril Lavigne, Hikaru Utada, Beyoncé, Britney Spears, Evanescence, NSYNC, Kylie Minogue, Limp Bizkit, Pink, Ringo Sheena, Taylor Swift, and Janelle Monáe, among others.

Personal life
In August 2018, Sawayama came out during an interview with Broadly, declaring: "I've always written songs about girls. I don't think I've ever mentioned a guy in my songs, and that's why I wanted to talk about it." She identifies as both bisexual and pansexual.

In May 2020, Sawayama revealed that she was doing an online course at the University of Oxford. In July 2020, she signed an open letter to the UK Equalities minister Liz Truss calling for a ban on all forms of LGBT+ conversion therapy. In a September 2022 interview with Them, Sawayama mentioned that she has IBS.

Filmography

Film

Television

Discography

Studio albums

Live album

Reissues

Extended plays

Singles

As lead artist

As featured artist

Promotional singles

Other charted songs

Awards and nominations

Tours

Headlining
Ordinary Superstar Tour (2018)
The Dynasty Tour (2021–2022)
Hold the Girl Tour (2022–2023)

Supporting
Charli Live Tour (with Charli XCX) (2019)

Notes

References

External links
 

1990 births
Living people
21st-century Japanese women singers
21st-century Japanese singers
Alumni of Magdalene College, Cambridge
Alumni of the University of Oxford
Bisexual singers
Bisexual songwriters
Bisexual women
Dirty Hit artists
Japanese expatriates in the United Kingdom
Japanese rhythm and blues singers
Japanese singer-songwriters
Japanese women in electronic music
Japanese women singer-songwriters
LGBT models
Japanese LGBT singers
Japanese LGBT songwriters
English LGBT singers
English LGBT songwriters
Musicians from Niigata Prefecture
Pansexual musicians
Pansexual women
People from Niigata (city)
English-language singers from Japan